"You and Tequila" is a song written by Matraca Berg and Deana Carter, and recorded by American country music artist Kenny Chesney. It was released in May 2011 as the fourth single from his album Hemingway's Whiskey (2010). Chesney's version of the song features a guest vocal from Grace Potter, lead singer of Grace Potter and the Nocturnals. On November 30, the song received two nominations in 54th Grammy Awards for Best Country Song and Best Country Duo/Group Performance. A live version of the song appears on Chesney's 2012 album Welcome to the Fishbowl.

Background and writing
Deana Carter and Matraca Berg co-wrote the song, and both recorded their own versions: Carter on her album I'm Just a Girl (2003), and Berg on her 2011 album The Dreaming Fields.

Carter told Taste of Country that Berg was inspired to write the song after having been out on the town. According to Carter, the two began talking about relationships, when Carter said, "Yeah, it's just like men… they get in your blood!" Also, Carter added several references to California, because she was living there at the time.

Chesney first heard the song when he and Carter toured together back in 2003. He said that he identified with it more after he rented a house in Malibu, California. Chesney said that he chose to record the song because it reminded him of driving the Pacific Coast Highway. He also told National Public Radio host David Green that "there are some commonalities about getting someone out of your mind and drinking and trying to quit."

Song information
Chesney and Potter's version of the song is set in the key of G major with a vocal range from G3 to E5. The main chord pattern is G5-G/B-Bsus2-G5.

Critical reception
Chesney's version of the song has received positive reviews from music critics. Chris Talbott of the Associated Press called it a "melancholy love-hate song", and an uncredited review in HitFix called the song "exquisite" and one of Chesney's "career high notes". Bobby Peacock of Roughstock rated the song four-and-a-half stars out of five, praising Chesney's and Potter's vocals and the "understated simplicity" of the lyrics. Bill Friskics-Warren of The Washington Post thought that the song had an Americana influence and made the album Chesney's "most stylistically wide-ranging to date."

Music video
Potter appears in the song's music video, which was filmed in Malibu, California and directed by Shaun Silva.

Chart performance

Year-end charts

Certifications

References

2011 singles
2003 songs
Country ballads
2010s ballads
Deana Carter songs
Matraca Berg songs
Kenny Chesney songs
Songs written by Matraca Berg
Songs written by Deana Carter
Music videos directed by Shaun Silva
Song recordings produced by Buddy Cannon
BNA Records singles
Male–female vocal duets
Songs about alcohol